is a town located in Yoshida District, Fukui Prefecture, Japan. ,  the town had an estimated population of 18,746 in 6,262 households and the population density of 200 persons per km2. The town is named for the famous temple of Eihei-ji.

Geography
Eiheiji is located in Yoshida District in northern Fukui Prefecture, in the river valley of the Kuzuryū River.

Neighbouring municipalities
Fukui Prefecture
Awara
Fukui
Katsuyama

Climate
Eiheiji has a Humid climate (Köppen Cfa) characterized by warm, wet summers and cold winters with heavy snowfall.  The average annual temperature in Eiheiji is 14.1 °C. The average annual rainfall is 2459 mm with September as the wettest month. The temperatures are highest on average in August, at around 26.7 °C, and lowest in January, at around 2.6 °C.

Demographics
Per Japanese census data, the population of Eiheiji has remained relatively steady over the past 50 years.

History
Eiheiji is part of ancient Echizen Province, and has been populated since the Japanese Paleolithic period. Numerous Kofun period remains have been found in the area, which was part of a large shōen in the Heian period.  During the Kamakura period, in 1244, the monk Dōgen established the Sōtō Zen monastery of Eihei-ji, and the present town developed as a monzen-machi town attached to the temple. During the Edo period, the area was part of the holdings of Fukui Domain. Following the Meiji restoration, it was organised into part of Yoshida District in Fukui Prefecture.  With the establishment of the modern municipalities system on April 1, 1889, the villages of Shihidani, Shimoshihi and Jōhō-ji were established. These villages were merged to form the village of Shihi on March 1, 1954. On September 1, 1962 Shihi was raised to town status, and was renamed Eiheiji.

On February 13, 2006 the town of Matsuoka and the village of Kamishihi, both from Yoshida District, were merged into the town of Eiheiji.

Economy
Eiheiji's economy is heavily reliant on the flow of tourists and pilgrims to the Eihei-ji temple, which serves as a sizable seminary for the St. Zen faith.

Aoyama Harp, the only harp manufacturer in Japan, is located in Eiheiji.

Education
Eiheiji has seven public elementary schools and three middle schools operated by the town government. The town does not have a high school. Fukui Prefectural University has a campus at Eiheiji, and the medical school of the University of Fukui is also located in the town.

Transportation

Railway
  Echizen Railway Katsuyama Eiheiji Line
  -  -  -  -  -  -  -  -  -  -

Highway
 Chubu-Jukan Expressway

International relations 
 - Zhangjiagang, Jiangsu, China, friendship city to former Matsuoka Town since August 1997

Local attractions
Eihei-ji, head temple and seminary of the Sōtō Zen sect
Matsuoka Kofun Cluster, National Historic Site

References

External links

 

 
Towns in Fukui Prefecture